Nannostomus beckfordi, (from the Greek: nanos = small, and the Latin stomus = relating to the mouth; beckfordi = in honor of British naturalist, F.J.B. Beckford), commonly known as the golden pencil fish or Beckford's pencil fish, is a freshwater species of fish  belonging to the characin family Lebiasinidae. It occurs widely and commonly in swamps and slow-moving waters in Brazil, Guyana, French Guiana, and Suriname.

References 

Lebiasinidae
Fish described in 1872
Taxa named by Albert Günther
Fish of South America
Fish of the Amazon basin